Wilbur Allen "Bill" Coven (February 16, 1920 – December 7, 1998) was an American professional basketball player. He played in the National Basketball League for the Rochester Royals during the 1946–47 season and averaged 1.8 points per game.

References

External links
 Elyria Sports Hall of Fame profile

1920 births
1998 deaths
United States Army personnel of World War II
American men's basketball players
Baldwin Wallace Yellow Jackets men's basketball players
Basketball players from Ohio
Centers (basketball)
Forwards (basketball)
North Carolina Tar Heels men's basketball players
People from Elyria, Ohio
Rochester Royals players
Toledo Rockets men's basketball players